(June 14, 1588 – December 22, 1661) was a Japanese daimyō of the Edo period, who ruled the Iino Domain. He was first a senior hatamoto with a 3000 koku income, before he was made lord of Iino.

References 

1588 births
1661 deaths
Daimyo
Hatamoto
Hoshina clan